Silburn is a surname. Notable people with the surname include:

Elaine Silburn (born 1928), Canadian long and triple jumper
Lilian Silburn (1908–1993), French Indologist

Fictional characters
Joshua Silburn Jr., a character in the television series The Messengers